Abraham Niyonkuru (born 26 December 1989) is a Burundian track and field athlete who specialises in the marathon, the 10,000 metres and cross country running. Niyonkuru competed in the 2016 Summer Olympics in Rio de Janeiro, Brazil. At the Olympics, he competed in the marathon. Niyonkuru has also competed in a World Junior Championships, two World Cross Country Championships, a Jeux de la Francophonie, a World Military Track and Field Championships and an Auray-Vannes Half Marathon.

Competition
Niyonkuru's debut at an international competition was at the 2005 IAAF World Cross Country Championships. He competed in the junior men's race and finished 33rd out of 133 athletes in a time of 25 minutes and 32 seconds. At the 2005 Jeux de la Francophonie Niyonkuru competed in the 10,000 metres. Niyonkuru finished fourth in a time of 29 minutes and 18.08 seconds, only 0.03 seconds behind the silver medalist, Moroccan Abderrahim Goumri. Niyonkuru then competed in the 2006 World Junior Championships. He finished fifth in the 10,000 metres in a time of 28 minutes and 59.92 seconds. He was 6.63 seconds behind the race winner, Ibrahim Jeilan of Ethiopia. In 2007, Niyonkuru competed at the 2007 World Cross Country Championships in the junior men's race. He finished 13th in 24 minutes and 56 seconds. He finished 49 seconds behind the gold-medalist, Kenyan Asbel Kiprop. At the 2009 World Military Track and Field Championships, Niyonkuru won the silver medal in the 10,000 metres. His time of 29 minutes and 37.14 seconds was 23.67 seconds behind the gold medalist, Essa Ismail Rashed of Qatar. Niyonkuru was 4.97 seconds ahead of the bronze medalist, Tunisian El Akhdar Hachani. Niyonkuru won the 2015 Auray-Vannes Half Marathon in a time of one hour, three minutes and twenty seconds. At the 2016 Summer Olympics, Niyonkuru competed in the men's marathon on 21 August 2016, but did not finish the race. In 2017 he competed in the men's marathon at the 2017 World Championships in Athletics, placing 71st in 2:42:27.

Notes

References

External links
 

1989 births
Living people
Burundian male marathon runners
Olympic athletes of Burundi
Athletes (track and field) at the 2016 Summer Olympics
Place of birth missing (living people)